This is a list of films produced in South Korea in 1960:

External links
1960 in South Korea

 1960-1969 at koreanfilm.org

South Korea
1960
Films